Georges Kiamuangana Mateta (19 May 1944 – 13 October 2022), known professionally as Verckys, was a Congolese saxophonist, composer, bandleader, producer, record label founder, and music-business executive. He was renowned as a talented and prolific musician, and was the first indigenous African to own a record label, through which he introduced many major Congolese artists to the world.

Biography
Born in Kisantu as Georges Kiamuangana on 19 May 1944, he came from a wealthy family; his father was a businessman in Leopoldville (now Kinshasa). Kiamuangana learned music at church. As a saxophonist, he adopted the name Verckys based on American saxophone player King Curtis, hearing the name "Curtis" as "Verckys." 

Verckys was a one-time member of the prolific rhumba band TPOK Jazz, led by François Luambo Makiadi, which dominated the Congolese music scene from the 1950s through the 1980s.

In 1969, Verckys left TPOK Jazz and formed his own band, Orchestre Vévé. Verkys also managed two other bands, which he owned: Orchestre Kiam and Orchestre Lipua Lipua. Among the musicians who played for Verkys in the 1970s are Nyboma Mwandido and Pepe Kalle. During the early 1980s Verckys quit the music scene, to pursue other interests.

In 2015, Sterns Music released in MP3 form much of the output of Verckys's Éditions Vévé record label (the blog post announcing this includes a biography of Verckys).

Personal life and death 
Verckys had 13 children; four born to Lucie Bola (his legal wife), four others to Christine Ngoy, and two to Stéphanie Feza. He died in Kinshasa on 13 October 2022, at the age of 78.

Discography
Compilations
 Verckys & L'Orchestre Veve, Congolese Funk, Afrobeat and Psychedelic Rumba 1969 - 1978 (2014, Analog Africa)
 Verckys, Edition Veve 1969-1972 (2015, Sterns)
 Verckys, Edition Veve 1972-1978 (2015, Sterns)
 Verckys, Edition Veve 1969-1978 (2015, Sterns)
 Verckys, Edition Veve 1972-1975 (2015, Sterns)

Contributing artist
 The Rough Guide to Congo Gold (2008, World Music Network)

See also
 Franco Luambo Makiadi
 Sam Mangwana
 Josky Kiambukuta
 Simaro Lutumba
 Ndombe Opetum
 Youlou Mabiala
 Mose Fan Fan
 Wuta Mayi
 TPOK Jazz
 List of African musicians

References

External links
 Overview of Composition of TPOK Jazz
 
 

1944 births
2022 deaths
Democratic Republic of the Congo musicians
People from Kinshasa
Soukous musicians
TPOK Jazz members
20th-century saxophonists
20th-century male musicians
21st-century saxophonists
21st-century male musicians